Qarneh is a village in Isfahan Province, Iran.

Qarneh may also refer to:
 Qarneh, Razavi Khorasan
 Qarneh, West Azerbaijan